Charles Meyer may refer to:

Charles Meyer (cyclist) (1868–1931), Danish cyclist
Charles R. Meyer (1911–2001), American brigadier general
Charles A. Meyer (1918–1996), U.S. Assistant Secretary of State for Inter-American Affairs from 1969 to 1973
Charles Mayer (composer) (1799–1862), or Meyer, Prussian pianist and composer

See also
Charles Mayer (disambiguation)
Charles Maier (disambiguation)